SM UB-148 was a German Type UB III submarine or U-boat built for the German Imperial Navy during World War I. She was commissioned into the German Imperial Navy on 19 September 1918 as UB-148 .

Construction

She was built by AG Weser of Bremen and following just under a year of construction, launched at Bremen on 7 August 1918. UB-148 carried 10 torpedoes and was armed with a  deck gun. UB-148 had a displacement of  while surfaced and  when submerged. Her engines enabled her to travel at  when surfaced and  when submerged.

References

Notes

Citations

Bibliography 

 

German Type UB III submarines
World War I submarines of Germany
1918 ships
Ships built in Bremen (state)
U-boats commissioned in 1918